Baraza la Sanaa la Taifa (BASATA; Swahili for National Arts Council) is the national council founded in 1984 by government legislation to serve as a facilitator and promoter of Tanzanian arts, music and theatre arts. BAMUTA, the National Music Council, founded in 1974 was merged into BASATA on the latter's founding.

References

Cultural organisations based in Tanzania
Government agencies of Tanzania